Kuakatch is a populated place situated in Pima County, Arizona, United States. Historically, it has also been known as Kookatsh, Pozo de Federico, and Walls Well. The last variation was derived from Frederick Wall, who dug a well just south of the Tohono O'odham village in the late 1800s. The name was officially designated as Kuakatch by a Board on Geographic Names decision in 1941. Kuakatch is derived from the Tohono O'odham phrase, ku:kaj, meaning "its end", referring to the nearby mountain, thus Kuakatch means "end of the mountain".

References

Populated places in Pima County, Arizona